The Nevada County Narrow Gauge Railroad & Transportation Museum is a transport museum and heritage railroad located in Nevada City, California.

The museum offers a collection of railroad artifacts, photographs, and documents related to the Nevada County Narrow Gauge Railroad, the  narrow gauge railroad that operated in Nevada and Placer Counties from 1876 until 1942.  Exhibits include Engine 5 which appeared in many movies, and various pieces of restored rolling stock.  Short excursions on board a variety of railroad equipment are offered in the museum's rail yard.

The county's first steam automobile and displays of local aviation history are also presented.

Admission is free.

See also

List of heritage railroads in the United States

External links
Museum's website

References

Railroad museums in California
Automobile museums in California
Aerospace museums in California
Heritage railroads in California
3 ft gauge railways in the United States
Museums in Nevada County, California
Narrow gauge railroads in California
Buildings and structures in Nevada City, California